Pierrick Naud (born January 26, 1991) is a Canadian former cyclist, who competed professionally between 2012 and 2017 for the Ekoi.com–Gaspésien,  and  teams.

Major results

2008
 5th Overall Coupe des Nations Abitibi
2013
 Canada Summer Games
1st  Road race
1st  Criterium
 2nd Tour de Québec
2014
 1st Stage 4 Redlands Bicycle Classic
 2nd Overall Grand Prix Cycliste de Saguenay
 3rd White Spot / Delta Road Race
2015
 6th Overall Grand Prix Cycliste de Saguenay
1st Stage 3
2016
 9th Overall Grand Prix Cycliste de Saguenay

References

External links

1991 births
Living people
Canadian male cyclists
People from Amos, Quebec
Sportspeople from Quebec
20th-century Canadian people
21st-century Canadian people